Jiangxi Olympic Sports Centre Stadium is a multi-purpose stadium in Nanchang, China.  It is currently used mostly for football matches. The stadium holds 50,000 spectators. It opened in 2010.

References

Football venues in China
Athletics (track and field) venues in China
Multi-purpose stadiums in China
Sports venues in Jiangxi